Trichordestra tacoma, the Tacoma polia, is a species of cutworm or dart moth in the family Noctuidae. It is found in North America.

The MONA or Hodges number for Trichordestra tacoma is 10303.

References

Further reading

 
 
 

Hadenini
Articles created by Qbugbot
Moths described in 1900